Abu'l-Mawadda Sayyid Muhammad Khalil al-Muradi (died 1791) — was a Syrian historian under the Ottoman Empire.  He was born into a family of ulema and acted as Hanafi mufti and naqib al-ashraf (head of the Prophet's descendants) in Damascus.  He wrote a set of over 1,000 biographies of people of his time, entitled Silk al-durar.

Editions

Khalīl b. ʿAlī al-Murādī. Kitāb Silk al-durar fī aʿyān al-qarn al-thānī ʿashar.  Būlāq: Al-Maṭbaʻah al-ʻĀmirah, 1874-83.
Muḥammad Khalīl b. ʿAlī al-Murādī. Kitāb Silk al-durar fī aʿyān al-qarn al-thānī ʿashar. Ed. Muḥammad ʿAbd al-Qādir Shāhīn, 4 vols. Beirut: Dār al-Kutub al-ʿIlmiyyah, 1997.
A sequence of twenty-nine mostly two-line maqāṭīʿ poems ending in the hemistich 'sweeter even than the juice of myrtle berries', which al-Murādī included in his entry for his uncle Ibrāhīm ibn Muḥammad al-Murādī, is edited and translated by Adam Talib, How Do You Say “Epigram” in Arabic? Literary History at the Limits of Comparison, Brill Studies in Middle Eastern Literatures, 40 (Leiden: Brill, 2018), pp. 94–115; .

References

18th-century historians from the Ottoman Empire
People from Damascus
1791 deaths
Year of birth unknown
18th-century Arabs